Table tennis at the 2019 Southeast Asian Games was held at the Subic Bay Exhibition & Convention Center, Subic Bay Freeport Zone, Zambales, Philippines from 6 to 10 December 2019.

Participating nations
A total of 49 athletes from nine nations competed in table tennis at the 2019 Southeast Asian Games:

Competition schedule
The following is the competition schedule for the table tennis competitions:

Medalists

Medal summary

See also
Table tennis at the 2020 ASEAN Para Games

References

External links
  

 
2019
Southeast Asian Games
2019 Southeast Asian Games events
Table tennis competitions in the Philippines